This is a list of members of Parliament in Wales, elected for the Fifty-Second Parliament of the United Kingdom in the 1997 general election. They are arranged by party.

Labour Party 

 Nicholas Ainger
 Donald Anderson
 Martin Caton
 Ann Clwyd
 Denzil Davies
 Ron Davies
 Huw Edwards
 Paul Flynn
 Win Griffiths
 Peter Hain
 Dave Hanson
 Alan Howarth
 Kim Howells
 Jackie Lawrence
 Barry Jones
 Jon Owen Jones
 Martyn Jones
 Alun Michael
 Julie Morgan
 Rhodri Morgan
 Paul Murphy
 John Morris
 Ray Powell
 Allan Rogers
 Ted Rowlands
 Chris Ruane
 John Smith
 Llew Smith
 Gareth Thomas
 Don Touhig
 Alan Williams
 Betty Williams

Liberal Democrats 

 Richard Livsey
 Lembit Öpik

Plaid Cymru 

 Cynog Dafis
 Ieuan Wyn Jones
 Elfyn Llwyd
 Dafydd Wigley
 Alan Williams

See also 

 Lists of MPs for constituencies in Wales

1997-2001
Lists of UK MPs 1997–2001